Glynneath is the name of an electoral ward in Neath Port Talbot county borough, Wales.

The electoral ward of Glynneath consists of some or all of the following settlements: Glynneath,  Morfa Glas, Rheola, Crugau, Pont-walby, Bryn-awel, Pentreclwydau and Aber-pergwym in the parliamentary constituency of Neath.  Most of the ward consists of woodland.  The floor of the Vale of Neath crosses the ward on its south eastern edge.  The biggest settlement in the ward is in the town of Glynneath near the northeast.  The far north eastern areas of the ward consists of open farmland.

Glynneath is bounded by the wards of Onllwyn to the north; Tawe Uchaf (in Powys) to the north-east; Rhigos (in Rhondda Cynon Taf) to the east; Blaengwrach to the south-east; Resolven to the south; Crynant to the south-west; and Seven Sisters to the west.

Election results
In the 2012 local council elections, the electorate turnout was 33.10%. The results were:

References

Electoral wards of Neath Port Talbot